Magiera is a surname. Notable people with it include:

Christopher Magiera (born 1983), American opera singer
Jacek Magiera (born 1977), Polish footballer
Jan Magiera (born 1938), Polish cyclist
Katharina Magiera, German opera singer
Mariusz Magiera (born 1984), Polish footballer

Surnames of Polish origin